Dauth is a surname. Notable people with the surname include:

John Dauth (born 1947), Australian public servant and diplomat
Thorsten Dauth (born 1968), German decathlete